George W. Johnson Park Carousel is a historic carousel located at Endicott in Broome County, New York. The carousel and its pavilion were built in 1934.  The carousel is housed in a wooden, one story, 16-sided, pavilion. The carousel has 36 horses standing three abreast, each of which is a "jumper," and two chariots. It was constructed by the Allan Herschell Company. It is one of six carousels donated to the citizens of Broome County by George F. Johnson (1857–1948), president of Endicott Johnson Corporation.

It was listed on the National Register of Historic Places in 1992.

Other carousels located in the Greater Binghamton Region:
 C. Fred Johnson Park Carousel
 George F. Johnson Recreation Park Carousel
 Highland Park Carousel
 Ross Park Carousel
 West Endicott Park Carousel

References

External links
 Visiting information on the Broome County carousels

Parks in Broome County, New York
History of Broome County, New York
Carousels on the National Register of Historic Places in New York (state)
National Register of Historic Places in Broome County, New York
Amusement rides introduced in 1934
Buildings and structures in Broome County, New York
Tourist attractions in Broome County, New York
1934 establishments in New York (state)